Enrique Falconí Mejía was a Peruvian politician in the late 1970s. He was the mayor of Lima from 1977 to 1978.

References

Mayors of Lima

Possibly living people
Year of birth missing